A donjon or keep is a defensive tower.

Donjon may also refer to:
 Donjon (role-playing game)
 Donjon (bande dessinée) or Dungeon, a series of comics

See also

Don Jon, a 2013 romantic comedy film